Tui Cathedral is a late-Romanesque and Gothic-style Roman Catholic church in the town of Tui, in Galicia, Spain. It is located at San Fernando square, in the center of the town.

Construction began in the 12th century and the northern portal and layout derive from this age. The main facade (1225) however is of a later Gothic style. The main chapel located in the choir was completed in 1699 by Castro Canseco. The interior has a large prominent retablo de la Expectacion, and a large altar of relics in the Chapel of the Relics. 
The cloister is in Gothic style.

References

Roman Catholic cathedrals in Galicia (Spain)
Romanesque architecture in Galicia (Spain)
Gothic architecture in Galicia (Spain)
12th-century Roman Catholic church buildings in Spain
Churches in Galicia (Spain)
Bien de Interés Cultural landmarks in the Province of Pontevedra